Song Ui-young (born 8 November 1993) is a professional footballer who plays as a midfielder or forward for Thai League 1 club Nongbua Pitchaya. Born in South Korea, he represents the Singapore national team. 

Arguably one of the most accomplished midfielders in the SPL, he is known for his high work rate and superb technical abilities. He moved to Singapore in 2011 to join Home United – now known as the Lion City Sailors.

Early life 
Song was born in Incheon, South Korea and spent most of his childhood between school and football. Song was known as a quiet child during his schooling days, but stood out for his footballing skills and passion for the sport. He was scouted in his final year of elementary school to join Cheong Wang Middle School, a school renowned for its footballing programme. Song also moved to the dormitory as the school premises were situated in the Gyeonggi-do province, away from Incheon where he lived.

Youth career 
At the age of 13, Song began training with the school team of Cheong Wang Middle School. In the final year of middle school, Song was made the team captain and his head coach also put in a recommendation during his graduation for him to attend his high school education at Yeouido High School, which was known for its affiliations with K League Classic club Suwon Samsung Bluewings.

Club career

Home United 
By the recommendation of his coach from Yeouido High School, Song left South Korea at the age of 18 to pursue footballing opportunities in Singapore. Song's move to Singapore was eased by the presence of Home United's assistant coach Baek Jong-seok, whom he shared an apartment with. Song subsequently joined Home United's youth team, which participates in the Prime League, before being promoted to join the first team which competed in the S.League. On 12 July 2012, Song made his debut appearance for the Protectors in the uniformed derby against Warriors FC. He played a total of 46 minutes in his first competitive match for the club, which subsequently ended in a 0–3 loss for his side.

Former Home United coach Philippe Aw who managed the Singapore Selection side for the 2016 Sultan of Selangor Cup, selected Song in the 18-man squad for the cup tie that took place at the Shah Alam Stadium on 7 May 2016. He came on as a substitute in the 56th minute, and played the remainder of the match which eventually ended 1-1 (3-4 on penalties) in a win for the Singapore Selection team.

Song often spearhead the attacking players in the false nine position. Alongside Shahril Ishak, he enjoyed a prolific start to the 2018 Singapore Premier League campaign before encountering an injury that ruled him out for the latter half of the season. Song also played a pivotal role in helping the club to a second-place finish, scoring a total of 20 goals over the entire season, securing Home United with a play-off slot for the AFC Champions League as well as its highest ever AFC Cup finish in the quarter-finals. On 1 November 2018, it was reported that Song had rejected interest from Indonesian giants Persija Jakarta. Despite being offered a deal worth US$20,000 per month from the Indonesian club, Song chose to remain with Home United, stating his hopes of representing Singapore internationally in the future. He also signed a two-year contract extension with the Singapore-based club.

Lion City Sailors 
On 14 February 2020, Home United was purchased, privatised and officially renamed as Lion City Sailors by Singaporean billionaire, Forrest Li. Song remained with the rebranded side, representing the club for the 2020 Singapore Premier League season. 

Under new manager Kim Do-hoon, Song was part of the Lion City Sailors side that won the 2021 Singapore Premier League, scoring 7 goals in 15 league appearances. 

On 18 April 2022, Song scored his first goal in the AFC Champions League during the Sailors' 3–0 victory against K League 1 club Daegu FC during the 2022 season. Song ended the 2022 SPL season with 13 goals in 24 league games, finishing as the second highest Singaporean goalscorer in the league.

Nongbua Pitchaya 
On 15 January 2023, it was announced that Song had departed from Lion City Sailors and joined Thai League 1 club Nongbua Pitchaya.

International career 
After receiving Singaporean citizenship, Song was called up to the Singapore national team on 27 August 2021. On 11 November 2021, Song made his international debut in a friendly match against Kyrgyzstan. On 5 December 2021, Song made his competitive debut at the 2020 AFF Championship with a 3–0 victory against Myanmar. Song scored his first goal for Singapore in the second leg of the 2020 AFF Championship semi-final match against Indonesia. He scored his second goal and third goals in the Asian Cup third-round qualifiers. Song had given the Lions a dream lead against the Kyrgyz Republic in the first game of the qualifiers before two goals in three minutes condemned Singapore to a narrow defeat. His third goal for the Lions came in a 6–2 win over Myanmar in the final match of their qualifiers.

Style of play
Initially deployed as a defensive midfielder by former Home United head coach Lee Lim-saeng, Song was placed in more offensive roles under Aidil Sharin Sahak, playing in a variety of positions as a box-to-box or attacking midfielder, winger, second striker and even as a poacher.

Career statistics

Club

International
As of match played 3 Jan 2023. Appearances and goals by national team and year

International goals
Scores and results list Singapore's goal tally first.

Personal life 
During an interview in 2016, Song shared his eagerness of representing Singapore internationally, which included having to naturalise as a Singaporean citizen in the process and renouncing his South Korean citizenship. Song had also been applying to be a Singaporean citizen on his own merit, independent of the possibility of the Football Association of Singapore reviving the Foreign Sports Talent Scheme which was established in the 2000s. Furthermore, he had met FIFA eligibility rules for foreign players planning to represent other national teams, as he has never represented South Korea internationally. 

In 2020, after three unsuccessful attempts, Song successfully attained permanent residency in Singapore. A year later on 20 August 2021, Song formally became a Singaporean citizen, therefore making him eligible to represent the country that he has played in for most of his professional career.

Honours 
Lion City Sailors
 Singapore Premier League: 2021; runner-up: 2013, 2018
 Singapore Cup: 2013; runner-up: 2014, 2015
 Singapore Community Shield: 2019, 2022

References

External links 
 
 

Living people
1993 births
Sportspeople from Incheon
Singaporean footballers
Singapore international footballers
South Korean footballers
South Korean emigrants to Singapore
Home United FC players
Singapore Premier League players
Expatriate footballers in Singapore
South Korean expatriate footballers
Association football midfielders
Lion City Sailors FC players
Naturalised citizens of Singapore
Singaporean people of Korean descent
Song Ui-young
Expatriate footballers in Thailand
Immigrants to Thailand